William Beers House, also known as the Beers House, is a historic home located in Richmond, Virginia.  It was built in 1839, and is a three-story, three bay, Greek Revival style brick dwelling crowned by an Italianate bracketed cornice and shallow hipped roof. It features an entrance with sidelights and pilasters framed by a porch containing coupled Greek Doric order columns.  The house was enlarged to a full three stories in 1860. In 1965 the house was acquired by the Medical College of Virginia.

It was listed on the National Register of Historic Places in 1969.

References

Houses on the National Register of Historic Places in Virginia
Italianate architecture in Virginia
Greek Revival houses in Virginia
Houses completed in 1839
Houses in Richmond, Virginia
National Register of Historic Places in Richmond, Virginia
Virginia Commonwealth University